Jacob (Jaap) Nunes Vaz (20 September 1906 – 13 March 1943) was a Dutch journalist, writer, and editor. He was one of the main editors of Het Parool, an illegal Dutch newspaper founded during World War II.

Early life
Jaap Nunes Vaz was born in Amsterdam on 20 September 1906 to Isaac Nunes Vaz and Daatje Kinsbergen. Isaac's father was of Sephardic Jewish ancestry and both of his parents were of Ashkenazi Jewish ancestry. Jaap became a journalist once he graduated from school and joined the Onafhankelijke Socialistische Partij, a revolutionary socialist political party in the Netherlands. He held multiple jobs at different press agencies including Algemeen Nederlands Persbureau where he was a star reporter at the time of the German invasion. He was fired from his job in the fall of 1940 after the "Aryan Declaration".

Het Parool
Nunes Vaz hosted the first meeting of the Het Parool editorial board in his room on the Keizersgracht. He worked on the editorial board until he became the 5th executive editor, writing lead articles for the paper.

Death
On 25 October 1942, Nunes Vaz was arrested by the Gestapo after his hiding place was discovered in Wageningen. He was first sent to a convict prison in Scheveningen nicknamed "Orange Hotel" but was eventually transferred to Sobibór extermination camp via Westerbork where he was killed on 13 March 1943.

References

Dutch Ashkenazi Jews
Dutch male writers
Journalists from Amsterdam
Resistance members from Amsterdam
Dutch Sephardi Jews
World War II resistance press activists
Dutch Jews who died in the Holocaust
Dutch civilians killed in World War II
1906 births
1943 deaths
20th-century Dutch journalists